Love Lifts Us Up: A Collection 1968-83 is a compilation album by singer/songwriter Jennifer Warnes. It collects fourteen songs from Warnes' first five studio albums, two non-album singles and four tracks from motion picture soundtracks. It includes the hits "Right Time of the Night", which reached No. 6 on the Billboard singles chart, "I Know a Heartache When I See One", which peaked at No. 19, and "Up Where We Belong", a duet with Joe Cocker from the 1982 movie An Officer and a Gentleman, which stayed at No. 1 for three weeks.

Track listing

References

2004 compilation albums
Jennifer Warnes albums